Júlio César dos Santos, or simply Júlio Santos (born December 12, 1981 in Osasco), is a Brazilian central defender. He currently plays for Novo Hamburgo.

Honours
2000 - Campeonato Paulista (São Paulo)
2001 - Torneio Rio – São Paulo (São Paulo)
2002 - Supercampeonato Paulista (São Paulo)
2006 - Campeonato Goiano (Goiás)
2017 - Campeonato Gaúcho (Novo Hamburgo)

References

External links
 zerozero.pt
 Guardian Stats Centre
 sambafoot
 CBF

1981 births
Living people
People from Osasco
Brazilian footballers
Association football defenders
Expatriate footballers in France
Expatriate footballers in the Democratic Republic of the Congo
Brazilian expatriate footballers
Campeonato Brasileiro Série A players
Ligue 2 players
Campeonato Brasileiro Série B players
Campeonato Brasileiro Série C players
Campeonato Brasileiro Série D players
Brazil under-20 international footballers
São Paulo FC players
Paysandu Sport Club players
Goiás Esporte Clube players
CR Vasco da Gama players
Associação Desportiva São Caetano players
Tours FC players
TP Mazembe players
Associação Desportiva Recreativa e Cultural Icasa players
Clube Esportivo Lajeadense players
Esporte Clube Novo Hamburgo players
Sociedade Esportiva e Recreativa Caxias do Sul players
Esporte Clube São Bento players
Batatais Futebol Clube players
Footballers from São Paulo (state)